is the 26th single and the last single by Japanese pop singer and songwriter Miho Komatsu under Giza studio label. It was released 7 December 2005. The single reached #39 in its first week and sold 4,258 copies. It charted for 2 weeks and sold 4,931 copies. The single has the lowest rank chart in Oricon in her career.

Track list
All songs are written and composed by Miho Komatsu

arrangement: Yoshinobu Ohga
it was used as an ending theme for the TBS show Tokoro Man Yuuki.

Miho Komatsu / arrangement: Yoshinobu Ohga
 
arrangement and remix: Hiroshi Asai (The Tambourines)
I just wanna hold you tight 〜a strange town Mix〜
arrangement and remix: Mr.Lee
remix of 24th single
 (instrumental)

References 

2005 singles
2005 songs
Miho Komatsu songs
Songs written by Miho Komatsu
Giza Studio singles
Being Inc. singles
Song recordings produced by Daiko Nagato